Eagle Peak is a  mountain summit on the west end of the Tatoosh Range which is a sub-range of the Cascade Range. It's located south of Mount Rainier, within Mount Rainier National Park, and immediately east of Longmire. Eagle Peak was originally known as Simlayshe, a Native American word meaning eagle. George Longmire anglicized the name to Eagle Peak. The four mile Eagle Peak Trail leads to views of Mount Rainier. The summit of Eagle Peak requires scrambling. Precipitation runoff on the peak drains into the Nisqually River.

Climate
Eagle Peak is located in the marine west coast climate zone of western North America. Most weather fronts originate in the Pacific Ocean, and travel northeast toward the Cascade Mountains. As fronts approach, they are forced upward by the peaks of the Cascade Range (Orographic lift), causing them to drop their moisture in the form of rain or snowfall onto the Cascades. As a result, the west side of the North Cascades experiences high precipitation, especially during the winter months in the form of snowfall. Due to its temperate climate and proximity to the Pacific Ocean, areas west of the Cascade Crest very rarely experience temperatures below  or above . During winter months, weather is usually cloudy, but, due to high pressure systems over the Pacific Ocean that intensify during summer months, there is often little or no cloud cover during the summer. Because of maritime influence, snow tends to be wet and heavy, resulting in high avalanche danger. The months July through September offer the most favorable weather for viewing or climbing this peak.

References

External links
 National Park Service web site: Mount Rainier National Park
 Washington Trails Association web site: Eagle Peak Trail
 Eagle Peak hiking: YouTube

Cascade Range
Mountains of Lewis County, Washington
Mountains of Washington (state)
North American 1000 m summits